Albera Ligure is a comune (municipality) in the Province of Alessandria in the Italian region Piedmont, located about  southeast of Turin and about  southeast of Alessandria.

Albera Ligure borders the following municipalities: Cabella Ligure, Cantalupo Ligure, Fabbrica Curone, Montacuto, and Rocchetta Ligure.

References

Cities and towns in Piedmont
Articles which contain graphical timelines